Venerable Nikon the Dry was made a slave by the Polovtsians in the 11th century.  Prior to his capture he had been a monk of the monastery of the Kiev Caves, in what is today Ukraine.  Nikon endured a brutal captivity for a period of more than three years, eventually gaining his freedom by means of a miracle.

Venerable Nikon, before his freedom was gained, informed his slave master that Jesus would release him from bondage in three days.  As a consequence his master crippled Nikon's legs so that he could no longer walk.  Nonetheless, three days later Nikon was carried by God to Kiev unseen.

Some time later Venerable Nikon's former master encountered the holy man in the city.  The man repented of his former ways, was baptised, and became a disciple of Nikon.

Nikon was referred to as "the Dry" due to his intense practice of fasting.

Venerable Nikon the Dry died in 1101 and is commemorated on the date of his passing to eternity, 11 December, in the Eastern Orthodox and Byzantine Rite Catholic Churches.

See also

Hermit
Daniel the Stylite
God: Sole Satisfier

References

Greek Orthodox Calendar
Russian Orthodox Calendar

Hermits
Russian saints of the Eastern Orthodox Church
Eastern Catholic saints
Monks of Kyiv Pechersk Lavra

1101 deaths

Year of birth unknown